Jamie Herrell (born July 12, 1994)  is an American-born actress and beauty queen. She won Miss Philippines Earth 2014 and Miss Earth 2014 titles. Herrell was a recipient of the Outstanding Individual Award during the 80th Cebu City Charter Day Awarding Ceremony for her environmental advocacies.

Life and career

Early life and career beginnings
Herrell was born on July 12, 1994 in Glendora, east of Los Angeles, California to James Edward Herrell, an American from Seattle, Washington, and Mary Snow "Snowie" del Rosario a Filipino from Medellin, Cebu.

Herrell spent her childhood in the United States and then settled down in Cebu City where her mother is from. In Cebu, she was a Mass Communication student at the University of San Jose–Recoletos before transferring to International Academy of Film and Television to study acting. Aside from studying, she also manages her own dance company called Mactan Dynamics. She was also a former managerial director of Solid Source Trading for the Visayas Region. She acted in a few commercials and short films prior joining beauty pageants. In 2021, she graduated at University of San Jose–Recoletos with the BA in Liberal Arts and Commerce Major in Marketing and Communications degree.

Pageantry

Pre Miss Earth 
She competed in the Miss Resorts World Manila 2013 pageant, where she was unplaced. 
She won three titles in 2013: Sinulog Festival Queen 2013, Miss MegaCebu 2013, and Reyna ng Aliwan 2013.

Miss Philippines Earth 2014
Herrell participated in and won Miss Philippines Earth 2014 during the pageant's coronation night at the SM Mall of Asia Arena on May 11, 2014. Beating 49 other contestants, she qualified for the international Miss Earth crown on the same year.

During the question-and-answer portion, Herrell was asked by former Akbayan lawmaker Risa Hontiveros, "Do you think that we, human beings, have been good children to Mother Earth?" Herrell answered:

During the final question-and-answer portion, Herrell was asked by former Miss Earth 2008 Karla Henry, "What quality do you think make a Miss Philippines Earth?" Herrell answered:

Miss Earth 2014

By winning the Miss Philippines Earth 2014 title, Jamie became the Philippines' delegate for the Miss Earth 2014 finals.

On November 29, 2014, Herrell was crowned Miss Earth 2014 at the UP Theater by her predecessor, Alyz Henrich from Venezuela and obtained the second Miss Earth crown after Karla Henry's victory in 2008.

Media and environmental activism
The day after Herrell won Miss Earth 2014, she guested in the celebrity talk show in the Philippines, The Buzz and talked about her victory.

On December 16, 2014, Harrell joined members of the EcoWaste Coalition at a school in Paco, Manila to campaign against the use of firecrackers to avoid injuries and pollution during the New Year revelries.

Herrell flew to her hometown, Cebu, to celebrate her victory in here hometown and had various courtesy calls, press interviews, and environmental activities. During Christmas Eve, Herrell visited to Cebu Provincial Detention and Rehabilitation Center which serves as the home of the world-famous Cebu dancing inmates of whom she is a fan.

Herrell led a thousand dancers and artists in performing the finale of the grand parade during Sinulog Festival in January together with seven other beauty queens. The festival is an opportunity to express gratitude to the Holy Child.  In the same month, Herrell became the cover story in a local magazine. In the interviews, she shared that she and her Miss Philippines court are part of an ongoing environmental campaign called "Think Twice" in which they do school tours and seminars and instruct and inspire people on how they can think twice in finding alternatives to help the environment by conserving energy and minimizing carbon footprint.

In February 2015, Herrell spearheaded the "Think Twice" campaign in various school tours with her Miss Philippines Earth 2014 elemental court. One of which is a school in Manila where aside from sharing their environmental knowledge to the students, they also distributed recyclable rulers to these high school students. Another event was when Jamie and her court went to a school in Santa Rosa, Laguna to do various environmental campaigns and led the cutting of ribbon ceremony of the school's "Eco-Garden". Jamie also traveled to Placer, Masbate the same month to take part as one of the judges of the provincial pageant for Miss Philippines Earth.

Herrell was once again featured as one of the three beauty queens in a magazine through Muse magazine in their March 2015 issue. The other beauty queens are Miss International 2013 Bea Santiago and Miss Universe 2013 Third Runner Up Ariella Arida.

Herrell hosted the Makati Earth Hour 2015 at the Ayala Triangle Gardens and Tower One and Exchange Plaza on March 28, 2015 which has been held by the city government since 2008 together with partners to lower carbon dioxide emissions and enhance awareness among residents, the business community, and other stakeholders on the importance of lower energy consumption.

Herrell led the Earth Day Bike Parade on April 21 together with Miss Philippines Earth 2015 candidates and Miss Earth Foundation's Princess Manzon. The ride is organized by the National Bike Organization and the Department of Environment and Natural Resources, which aims to promote non-motorized transportation in support of the objectives of the Clean Air Act. In celebration of Earth Day, Herrell was invited by Thomson Reuters where she spoke about her environmental advocacy during a forum at McKinley Hill. Herrell also took part in the "Make a Pledge" campaign and encouraged everyone to "Think Twice" about the potential impact of our every day lifestyle choices on the sustainability of the planet Earth.

Herrell, together with Miss Earth Foundation executives Catherine Untalan and  AJ Mira, did a courtesy visit and environmental presentation at Malacañang Palace in May 2015.

Herrell screened the aspired candidates for Miss Philippines Earth 2015 and participated in all the environmental activities of the pageant. And on May 31, 2015, Jamie passed the crowned to the new winner, Angelia Ong of the City of Manila.

Herrell's international trip started officially when she traveled to Sri Lanka after her Miss Philippines Earth 2015 duties and had interviews and pictorials for Derana TV and for various magazines and newspapers including Hi Magazine, Sunday Lankadeepa and Sunday Times. She also participated in a tree planting activity and a toured Colombo. Herrell visited the Miss Earth Sri Lanka 2015 pageant and at the end of the event, Herrell together with Miss Earth Sri Lanka 2014 Imaya Liyanage, crowned Visna Fernando as the winner of Miss Earth Sri Lanka 2015.  She also led a lake clean-up activity with Derana TV, the Miss Earth Sri Lanka beauties and volunteers. Thereafter, she visited the Sri Lanka Tourism Promotion Bureau where she planted the one millionth tree of the bureau's "1 Million Tree Project".

On July 23, 2015,  Herrell traveled to the Miss Earth Reunion 2015 pageant on Reunion Island. On July 25, Herrell and Miss Earth Reunion 2014 Lolita Hoarau crowned Jade Soune-Seyne as the Miss Earth Reunion 2015.

Herrell was a featured guest in the Act Now! Conference 2015 in Joensuu, Finland from September 7 to 11, 2015 which focused on renewable energy together with Filipe Pinto, the winner of Ídolos Portugal season 3. She participated in the conference organised by ENO Programme Association and conducted workshops regarding renewable energy and tree planting activity in Koli Peace Park. Miss Earth 2012 Tereza Fajksová and Miss Earth 2010 Nicole Faria also attended the conference in 2013 and in 2011, respectively.

Right after her trip to Finland, Herrell traveled to Mexico for Miss Earth México 2015 pageant and was welcomed by the Miss Earth Mexico 2014 winner, Yareli Carrillo, and Miss Earth Mexico's national director, Paul Marsell.

On November 12, 2015, Herrel together with Miss Earth Belgium 2015 Elizabeth Dwomoh, participated in the tree planting activities at the Embassy Garden in Belgium and made a courtesy call with the Philippine Ambassador to Belgium Victoria Bataclan.

On October 29, 2016, Herrell was guest judge in the coronation night of Miss Earth 2016, in the Mall of Asia Arena, Pasay, Metro Manila, Philippines.

On the same month, Herrell graced the launch of Miss Earth Ghana Organization's "Trash in Bin Campaign" in Ghana with Miss Earth Ghana 2016 Deborah Eyram Dodor and promoted proper waste disposal and segregation.

In February 2019, Herrell becomes a news anchor for Cignal TV's news channels One News and One PH and also as a segment host in the channel’s flagship newscast One Balita with Raffy Tulfo).

Herrell served as the muse of Singapore at the 2019 Southeast Asian Games and paraded during the opening ceremony at the Philippine Arena in Bocaue, Bulacan, Philippines on November 30, 2019.

Awards and commendations

President and Congress commendations
Herrell was commended by  the office of the President of the Philippines and was honored both by the upper house and the lower house of the Philippine Congress by approving congress resolutions recognizing her victory in the Miss Earth pageant.

The office of the Philippine President, Benigno Aquino III applauded Herrell through the Presidential Communications Operations Office Secretary Herminio Coloma, Jr., for winning the Miss Earth 2014 beauty title and stated that her feat once again placed the Philippines on the world map in terms of beauty and talent.

The Senate of the Philippines made a press release which indicated that Senate Resolution No. 1039, authored by Senator Manuel Lapid, acknowledged the accomplishment of Herrell when she won the Miss Earth 2014 title against 83 other delegates around the world. She attended the Senate session where she was feted by the Philippine senators and bestowed a copy of a resolution to applaud her feat. The Senate resolution stated "By being crowned this year's most beautiful woman on the planet, Jamie Herrell gave Filipinos unparalleled pride and showed the world the grace and excellence of Filipino beauty."

The lower congress, House of Representatives of the Philippines also passed the HR01726 which is the House Resolution commending Herrell for winning the Miss Earth crown. Herrell was accompanied by the other elemental queens of Miss Earth 2014 attended the House of Representative session where she was given a copy of the resolution.

Outstanding Individual Award
On February 24, 2017, Herrell was bestowed the Outstanding Individual Award during the 80th Cebu City Charter Day awarding ceremony for her work in Sustainable Environment and Good Livelihood for the community.

References

External links
Jamie at Miss Earth official website
Miss Earth 2014 in Sri Lanka

1994 births
Miss Philippines Earth winners
Filipino people of American descent
Miss Earth winners
Living people
Miss Earth 2014 contestants
News5 people
Star Magic
People from Glendora, California
People from Cebu City
University of San Jose–Recoletos alumni
Cebuano beauty pageant winners